Fautrix aquilonia is a species of sea snail, a marine gastropod mollusk in the family Calliostomatidae.

Description
The length of the shell attains 12.6 mm.

Distribution
This marine species occurs off New Caledonia, Norfolk Island and New Zealand at depths between 206 m and 535 m.

References

 Marshall, B.A. (1995). Calliostomatidae (Gastropoda: Trochoidea) from New Caledonia, the Loyalty Islands and the northern Lord Howe Rise . pp. 381–458 in Bouchet, P. (ed.). Résultats des Campagnes MUSORSTOM, Vol. 14 . Mém. Mus. natn. Hist. nat. 167 : 381-458

External links

aquilonia
Gastropods described in 1995